George Espy Morrow (October 19, 1840 – Mar 19, 1900) was an American academic from Ohio. Born into a notable political family, he fought in the Civil War, then attended the University of Michigan Law School. After a decade as a newspaper editor, he became a professor at the Iowa Agricultural College, eventually becoming chair of the College of Agriculture. In 1877, he took a similar position at the University of Illinois College of Agriculture. There, he maintained an experimental field now known as the Morrow Plots, a National Historic Landmark. Morrow was president at the Oklahoma Agricultural and Mechanical College from 1895 to 1899.

Biography

Morrow was born near Cincinnati, Ohio, on October 19, 1840. He was the grandson of Jeremiah Morrow, the ninth Governor of Ohio and a U.S. Senator. George Morrow's parents were farmers, and he remained home until enlisting with the 24th Ohio Infantry for the Civil War in 1861. He was wounded at the Battle of Perryville and was briefly a prisoner of war. He was discharged in July 1863 due to failing health.

Following his discharge, he moved to Minnesota. After a few months, he decided to enroll in the University of Michigan Law School. He graduated in 1866 and took a position as editor of the Western Rural, later editing the Western Farmer. In 1876, Morrow accepted a position as professor at the Iowa Agricultural College, and eventually rose to chair the department. In 1877, Morrow accepted an appointment as chair of the University of Illinois College of Agriculture. Morrow implemented the Rothamsted Plan at the university to determine what could improve the quality of Illinois soil. The field became known as the Morrow Plots, today recognized as a National Historic Landmark for its contributions to the history of American agriculture. He later became president of the Oklahoma Agricultural and Mechanical College.

Morrow married Sarah M. Gifford in Detroit, Michigan, in 1867. They had three surviving children: Minnie, Clarence, and Grace. Morrow died on 26 Mar 1900 at his home in Paxton, Illinois and was buried in Mount Hope Cemetery in Urbana, Illinois.

References

External links
 

1840 births
1900 deaths
University of Michigan Law School alumni
University of Illinois Urbana-Champaign faculty
Iowa State University faculty
Presidents of Oklahoma State University
Oklahoma State University faculty
People from Paxton, Illinois
Educators from Cincinnati
People of Ohio in the American Civil War
American newspaper editors
Journalists from Ohio
Journalists from Illinois